The Inny Valley Railway was a private narrow gauge railway located at Trebullett, near Launceston in Cornwall, England.  The railway was established by James Evans and ran around a field adjoining a workshop for the railway and a mill.  Steam locomotives based at the railway were Velinheli built by Hunslet in 1886 and Sybil built by W.G. Bagnall in 1906, both previously in use at the Dinorwic Quarry.  There was also a diesel locomotive built by Motor Rail and a passenger carriage built using redundant church pews.  After closure the steam locomotives and carriage went to the Launceston Steam Railway whilst the diesel locomotive went to Alan Keef

See also 

 British narrow gauge railways

References 
 

1 ft 10¾ in gauge railways in England
Rail transport in Cornwall
Closed railway lines in South West England